Lower Swineshaw Reservoir is the second reservoir from the top of a series of four in the Brushes valley above Stalybridge in Greater Manchester. It was built in the 19th century to provide a supply of safe drinking water.  It is owned and operated by United Utilities. 
The reservoir dam consists of a clay core within an earth embankment.

Capacity

See also 
 Walkerwood Reservoir
 Brushes Reservoir
 Higher Swineshaw Reservoir

References 

Reservoirs in Greater Manchester